The 178th Pennsylvania House of Representatives District is located in Bucks County and includes the following areas:
 Northampton Township [PART, Districts 01, 02, 03, 04, 05, 06, 07, 08, 11, 12, 13, 15, 16, 17 and 18]
 Upper Southampton Township
 Warwick Township
 Wrightstown Township

Representatives

References

Government of Bucks County, Pennsylvania
178